Joculator tribulationis is a species of minute sea snail, a marine gastropod mollusc in the family Cerithiopsidae. The species was described by Hedley in 1909.

References

Gastropods described in 1909
tribulationis